Mat Thomas George (May 14, 1995 – July 17, 2021) was an American podcast host and Internet personality, known for his work on the podcast She Rates Dogs and numerous viral tweets. In 2017, he went viral for measuring the size of a microwave oven with bottles of New Amsterdam vodka. He graduated from Arizona State University in 2017.

He was killed in a hit and run accident in Los Angeles at the age of 26; his death sparked considerable attention online and was covered by media outlets such as Buzzfeed News and The New York Times.

References

1995 births
2021 deaths
American podcasters
Arizona State University alumni
Place of birth missing
Gay men
LGBT people from Missouri
People from Liberty, Missouri
Road incident deaths in California
Pedestrian road incident deaths